A cell phone lot is a parking lot, typically located at airports, where people can wait before picking up passengers.  The purpose of these lots is to reduce congestion at arrival sections by preventing cars from continuously circling around the airport or waiting on the sides of highways to avoid paying fees at the airport parking lots. Once the passenger's flight lands, after they collect their luggage and are ready to be picked up, they call the person waiting in the cell phone lot. These lots are usually free and only minutes away from the terminals.

Cellphone parking lots

Argentina
 Ministro Pistarini International Airport

Canada
 Ottawa Macdonald–Cartier International Airport 
 Montreal-Pierre Eliott Trudeau International Airport
 Toronto Pearson International Airport
 Vancouver International Airport

Panama
 Tocumen International Airport

United States
Many airports in the United States have cell phone lots.
Austin-Bergstrom International Airport
Baltimore–Washington International Airport
Boston Logan International Airport
Charlotte Douglas International Airport
Dallas/Fort Worth International Airport
Daniel K. Inouye International Airport
Daytona Beach International Airport
Denver International Airport
Des Moines International Airport
Detroit Metropolitan Airport
Eastern Iowa Airport, Cedar Rapids, IA
Eppley Airfield, Omaha
Fort Wayne International Airport
George Bush Intercontinental Airport, Houston
Harry Reid International Airport, Las Vegas, Nevada
Hartsfield-Jackson Atlanta International Airport
Indianapolis International Airport
John F. Kennedy International Airport, New York City
John Glenn Columbus International Airport
LaGuardia Airport
Los Angeles International Airport
Louis Armstrong New Orleans International Airport
Louisville International Airport
Memphis International Airport
Miami International Airport
Minneapolis-St. Paul International Airport
Nashville International Airport
Newark Liberty International Airport
Norfolk International Airport
Northwest Arkansas National Airport
O’Hare International Airport
Ontario International Airport
Orlando International Airport
Orlando Sanford International Airport
Philadelphia International Airport
Phoenix Sky Harbor International Airport
Pittsburgh International Airport
Raleigh-Durham International Airport
Reno–Tahoe International Airport
Richmond International Airport
Sacramento International Airport
San Antonio International Airport
San Francisco International Airport
Savannah/Hilton Head International Airport
Seattle–Tacoma International Airport
St. Louis Lambert International Airport
Tampa International Airport
Tulsa International Airport
Washington Dulles International Airport
Wichita Dwight D. Eisenhower National Airport
Wilkes-Barre/Scranton International Airport

References

Airport infrastructure